Zehn Mekhal Mohammed (born 28 February 2000) is an English professional footballer who last played as a defender for club Accrington Stanley.

Early and personal life
Mohammed is from Blackburn, and went to Queen Elizabeth’s Grammar School. He signed for Accrington Stanley at Under-16 level after playing Sunday league football for Mill Hill, and having a trial with the club. He previously played for Blackburn Rovers at youth level.

Career
He signed a professional contract with Accrington Stanley in May 2017.

In December 2017 he went on loan to Ramsbottom United. In the 2018-19 season he had further loan spells, joining Clitheroe on a short-term loan in August 2018 and making 8 appearances, playing for Southport on loan between November 2018 and January 2019, appearing once for the club in an FA Trophy match.

He made his professional debut for Accrington on 8 January 2019 in a Football League Trophy match against Bury. Later that month he joined FC United of Manchester on loan, making his debut the next day in a victory in a league match against Bradford Park Avenue. In 2019 July he joined Southport on loan until 20 January.

On 14 May 2021 Mohammed was released.

International career 
Zehn is eligible to play for Pakistan as he belongs to Pakistani background.

References

2000 births
People from Blackburn
Living people
Association football defenders
Accrington Stanley F.C. players
F.C. United of Manchester players
Ramsbottom United F.C. players
Clitheroe F.C. players
Southport F.C. players
National League (English football) players
Northern Premier League players
English footballers